is a lake located in the Chiba Prefecture of Japan, northeast of Tokyo.

Geography

Location 
Lake Tega is located entirely in the northwest of Chiba Prefecture, on the main island of Japan: Honshū.

Topography 
It has the distinction of being composed of two bodies of water: Lake (main) Tega and Lake Shimotega, a watercourse of the watershed of the Tone River.

References 

Lakes of Japan
Landforms of Chiba Prefecture